Bharat Ramamurti is an American attorney and political advisor who is serving as a member of the COVID-19 Congressional Oversight Commission, a congressional oversight body tasked with overseeing the Department of the Treasury's and the Federal Reserve Board's management of stimulus and loan programs mandated by the CARES Act. In 2020, he was chosen to serve as Deputy Director of the National Economic Council.

Education 
Ramamurti graduated from Lexington High School in Lexington, MA in 1999. He then  earned a bachelor's degree from Harvard College and his Juris Doctor from Yale Law School. His father Ravi Ramamurti did his doctorate at Harvard, and so did Bharat's twin siblings Gita and Arjun Ramamurti, according to Harvard Magazine.

Career 
After graduating from law school, Ramamurti worked as an intern in the legal department of the Boston Red Sox. He also worked as a litigator at Wilmer Cutler Pickering Hale and Dorr.

A longtime United States Senate staffer, Ramamurti worked as senior counsel for banking and economic policy in the Senate office of Elizabeth Warren from 2013 to 2019. He then served as economic policy director on the Elizabeth Warren 2020 presidential campaign. In 2017, Ramamurti was mentioned as a possible appointee to the U.S. Securities and Exchange Commission.

On April 17, 2020, it was announced that Senate Minority Leader Chuck Schumer had appointed Ramamurti to serve on the newly-created COVID-19 Congressional Oversight Commission. The Commission will have five members, one each appointed by the House Speaker, House Minority Leader, Senate Majority Leader, and Senate Minority Leader. After Ramamurti was nominated to serve on the Committee, he authored an op-ed in The New York Times about the panel's role in the oversight of the President's handling of the coronavirus pandemic. He served in the role until December 2020.

Personal life 
Ramamurti's parents came to the United States from the Southern Indian State of Tamil Nadu. Ramamurti is married to Paige Ammons, an attorney and consultant at TIME'S UP. Ramamurti and Ammons have three children and live in Washington, DC.

References

External links

American people of Indian Tamil descent
American politicians of Indian descent
Biden administration personnel
Harvard College alumni
Living people
United States congressional aides
Yale Law School alumni
Year of birth missing (living people)